Yohan Baï (born 28 September 1996) is a French professional footballer who plays as a midfielder for  club Bastia.

Career

Canet Roussillon
During summer 2020, Baï joined French side Canet Roussillon. The most famous moment in his career for the French side was the goal in the net of Marseille, with which the fourth division club eliminated Ligue 1 giants from the cup.

CSKA Sofia
On 28 May 2021, Baï joined Bulgarian First League side CSKA Sofia signing his first professional contract.

Bastia
On 22 July 2022, he signed a contract with Bastia for two seasons with an option for a third.

Personal life
Born in France, Baï is of Ivorian descent.

Career statistics

Club

References

External links

1996 births
Living people
Sportspeople from Arras
French sportspeople of Ivorian descent
French footballers
Footballers from Hauts-de-France
Association football wingers
Championnat National players
Championnat National 2 players
Championnat National 3 players
First Professional Football League (Bulgaria) players
Amiens SC players
SAS Épinal players
AS Furiani-Agliani players
CMS Oissel players
Canet Roussillon FC players
PFC CSKA Sofia players
SC Bastia players
French expatriate footballers
French expatriate sportspeople in Bulgaria
Expatriate footballers in Bulgaria